This is a list of draft picks by the Golden State Warriors of the NBA. In total, the Warriors have had 465 draft picks.

Key

Draft picks

Notes
6bc

References

 
National Basketball Association draft
draft history